Pittsburg, Kansas is a center of media in southeastern Kansas. The following is a list of media outlets based in the city.

Print

Newspapers
 Collegio, weekly, the Pittsburg State University student newspaper
 Pittsburg Morning Sun, five times a week

Radio
The following radio stations are licensed to and/or broadcast from Pittsburg:

AM

FM

Television
Pittsburg is the second principal city of the Joplin-Pittsburg television market. 

The following television stations are licensed to and/or broadcast from Pittsburg:

References

Mass media in Kansas
Pittsburg, Kansas